"In a Moment" is a song by rock band Stereophonics. It is the ninth track on their 2013 album Graffiti on the Train and was released as the album's lead-single on 4 November 2012.

Writing and release
When speaking to NME, lead singer Kelly Jones said the song is "about finding some hope in life. It's about those moments in life when you feel a bit lost and stuck and you don't know how to get out of it and then there's a glimmer of hope that helps you pull through it. It's quite a spiritual song."

The drum loop which is featured throughout the song was programmed by fellow producer Jim Lowe. Although Javier Weyler recorded the drums for the song, this is the first single to be released without him in the band as he left in July 2012.

Formats
Stereophonics released "In a Moment" as a free download on 4 November 2012. Due to it being free the song was not eligible to chart. Promotional singles were made available on 12 November 2012 which featured the song, radio edit and the instrumental version. The limited 10" vinyl edition with lyrics etched on Side B was available to pre-order on the band's website<ref>{{cite web |url=http://shop.stereophonics.com/music/in-a-moment-limited-edition-10-vinyl.html |title=In a Moment limited edition 10 Pre-order |publisher=The Stereophonics Ltd |access-date=29 July 2013 |archive-url=https://web.archive.org/web/20131108093135/http://shop.stereophonics.com/music/in-a-moment-limited-edition-10-vinyl.html |archive-date=8 November 2013 |url-status=dead }}</ref> and was released on 4 November 2012. The cover art for "In a Moment" was designed by Steve Goddard who also designed the oil painting artwork for Graffiti on the Train''.

Music video

The music video for "In a Moment" was directed by lead singer Kelly Jones and stars Liam Browne as a man stuck in a moment and Charlie Carter as a homeless man. It features an unnamed character (Browne) who tries to give money to homeless people but they refuse, wanting the food he's got instead. One of the homeless men (Carter) whom he offered money to, helps assist the character in taking his own life by burying him in the sand at the seashore, so when the tide comes in he would drown. The homeless man leaves the shovel in arms reach for the character, in case he changes his mind, and he also leaves the food and the wine he was given. As the character is about to drown, he then sees his good and bad memories, and realises his life is relevant and will get better, so he digs himself out before it's too late.

For the scene in which the character is buried in the sand, Browne's body was placed in a wooden box under the sand to prevent him from being physically buried and the top of the box was covered with sand, leaving his head above the sand and creating the illusion he's been physically buried. In the later scene when he gets out of the sand, Browne was buried in the sand horizontally.

Track listings

Personnel

Stereophonics
 Kelly Jones – lead vocals, guitar
 Richard Jones – bass guitar
 Adam Zindani – guitar, backing vocals
 Javier Weyler – drums

Technical
 Production – Kelly Jones, Jime Lowe
 Mixing – Jones, Lowe
 Engineering – Lowe
 Mastering – Dick Beetham

Release history

References
Notes

Footnotes

External links
 In a Moment at Stereophonics.com

2012 singles
Stereophonics songs
Songs written by Kelly Jones
2012 songs